Recruiting and retaining Scientologist celebrities and getting them to endorse Scientology to the public at large has been important to the Church of Scientology since its early days. The organization has had a written program governing celebrity recruitment since at least 1955, when L. Ron Hubbard created "Project Celebrity", offering rewards to Scientologists who recruited targeted celebrities. Early interested parties included former silent-screen star Gloria Swanson and jazz pianist Dave Brubeck. The Scientology organization has a particular interest in international focus on wealthy businesspeople and influencers to help promote its ideals. A Scientology policy letter of 1976 states that "rehabilitation of celebrities who are just beyond or just approaching their prime" enables the "rapid dissemination" of Scientology.

Coordinated effort
The Church of Scientology operates special Celebrity Centres. Scientology policy governs the Celebrity Centres (the main one in Los Angeles and others in Paris, Nashville, and elsewhere), stating that "one of the major purposes of the Celebrity Centre and its staff is to expand the number of celebrities in Scientology." (Scientology Flag Order 2310) Another order describes Celebrity Centre's Public Clearing Division and its goal, "broad public into Scientology from celebrity dissemination"; this division has departments for planning celebrity events and routing the general public onto Scientology services as a result of celebrity involvement.

As founder L. Ron Hubbard put it:
Celebrities are very Special people and have a very distinct line of dissemination. They have comm[unication] lines that others do not have and many medias [sic] to get their dissemination through (Flag Order 3323, 9 May 1973)

Hugh B. Urban, professor of religious studies in the Department of Comparative Studies at Ohio State University said about Scientology's appeal to celebrities in an interview for Beliefnet.com:

Journalistic and media sources claim that Scientology is "The Church of the Stars" or a "star-studded sect," although there are likely more Hollywood celebrities in other religious traditions. One reason for this is the church's Celebrity Centres, which is unique to the religion. Most members in these facilities are not celebrities, however, a lot of members are part of the entertainment industry.

Notable Scientologist celebrities

The Church of Scientology has a long history of seeking out artists, musicians, writers and actors, and states that Scientology can help them in their lives and careers. Celebrity Scientologists include:

 Kirstie Alley
 Anne Archer
 Catherine Bell
 Nancy Cartwright
 Erika Christensen
 Chick Corea
 Tom Cruise
 Jason Dohring
 Jenna Elfman
 Doug E. Fresh
 Isaac Hayes
 Vivian Kubrick
 Alanna Masterson
 Christopher Masterson
 Danny Masterson
 Elisabeth Moss
 Giovanni Ribisi
 John Travolta
 Greta Van Susteren

References

Scientology
Scientologists